Emmanuel Kwame Boakye is a Ghanaian politician and a member of the first Parliament of the fourth Republic representing the Offinso North constituency in the Ashanti region.  He served for one term as a member of parliament.

Early life and education
Boakye was born on 15 December 1944 at Nkenkaaso in the Ashanti Region of Ghana. He attended the Government Training College in Pusiga (now known as the Gbewaa College of Education) where he obtained his Teachers' Training Certificate.

Politics
Boakye was first elected into Parliament on the Ticket of the National Democratic Congress to represent the Offinso North Constituency in the Ashanti Region of Ghana. He won the seat during the 1992 Ghanaian parliamentary election. He contested again in 1996 as an independent candidate and lost the seat to Dr. Kofi K. Apraku who polled 10,456 votes representing 37.80% out of the total valid votes cast. Nana Oduro Baah of the National Democratic Congress polled 10,257 votes representing 37.10%, Nana Yaw Joseph of the People's National Convention polled 358 votes representing 1.30%, and Emmanuel Kwame Boakye also polled 357 votes representing 1.30%.

Religion
Boakye is a Christian.

Career
Boakye is a teacher by profession and a former member of Parliament for the Offinso North Constituency in the Ashanti Region of Ghana.

References

National Democratic Congress (Ghana) politicians
Ghanaian MPs 1993–1997
People from Ashanti Region
Ghanaian Christians
Ghanaian educators
21st-century Ghanaian politicians
Living people
Year of birth missing (living people)